"Goin' Down Hill" is a song co-written and recorded by American country music artist John Anderson.  It was released in June 1983 as the third single from the album Wild & Blue.  The song reached number 5 on the Billboard Hot Country Singles & Tracks chart. Anderson wrote the song with X. Lincoln (aka Billy Lee Tubb).

Chart performance

References

1983 singles
1983 songs
John Anderson (musician) songs
Songs written by John Anderson (musician)
Warner Records singles